Southern Cross is a town in Western Australia, 371 kilometres (230.5 miles) east of state capital Perth on the Great Eastern Highway. It was founded by gold prospectors in 1888, and gazetted in 1890. It is the major town and administrative centre of the Shire of Yilgarn.

The town of Southern Cross is one of the many towns that run along the Goldfields Water Supply Scheme pipeline from Mundaring to Kalgoorlie, engineered by C. Y. O'Connor, and as a consequence is an important location on the Golden Pipeline Heritage Trail.

A succession of gold rushes in the Yilgarn region near Southern Cross in 1887, at Coolgardie in 1892, and at Kalgoorlie in 1893 caused a population explosion in the barren and dry desert centre of Western Australia.

It is named after the Southern Cross constellation, and the town's streets are named after constellations and stars.

The surrounding areas produce wheat and other cereal crops. The town is a receival site for Cooperative Bulk Handling.

Southern Cross is in the Federal electorate of O'Connor.

Railway station 
Southern Cross railway station is on the standard gauge railway from Perth to Kalgoorlie.  The construction and opening of the line from Perth was completed on 1 May 1967, and the connection to Kalgoorlie via Koolyanobbing was completed by 4 November 1968.

The Prospector and Indian Pacific passenger trains service the town.

Narrow gauge route 
The former narrow gauge route of the Eastern Goldfields Railway reached Southern Cross on 1 July 1894, and the Southern Cross to Coolgardie narrow gauge railway (via Boorabbin) was closed 29 November 1971.

In 1932 the Wheat Pool of Western Australia announced that the town would have two grain elevators, each fitted with an engine, installed at the railway siding.

See also 

 Goldfields-Esperance
 Helena River
 John Forrest
 Mundaring Weir
 Cody Fern

References

External links 

Mining towns in Western Australia
Grain receival points of Western Australia
Eastern Goldfields Railway
Goldfields Water Supply Scheme
Shire of Yilgarn